In algebraic geometry, given an ample line bundle L on a compact complex manifold X, Matsusaka's big theorem gives an integer m, depending only on the Hilbert polynomial of L, such that the tensor power Ln is very ample for n ≥ m.

The theorem was proved by Teruhisa Matsusaka in 1972 and named by Lieberman and Mumford in 1975.

The theorem has an application to the theory of Hilbert schemes.

Notes 

Algebraic geometry